Yasmin Thayna is a Brazilian filmmaker who wrote and directed the short film, ′Kbela′ in 2015. ′Kbela′ won the 2017 award for Best Diaspora Short Film in the Africa Movie Academy Awards.

She is also a founder of the online film community Afroflix, which seeks to give people of color an opportunity to share and distribute their work. Thayna has worked on other short films, taught classes, and frequently gives talks about what it means to be black.

Personal life
Yasmin Thayna was born in 1993 to a black mother and white father in an area outside of Rio de Janeiro called Baixada Fluminense. Growing up she struggled with her identity as a black woman and that is what led her to create her short film Kbela.

References 

Brazilian filmmakers

1993 births
Living people